is a French retail banking network. It consists of the following banks:
 , Toulouse, Aquitaine (oldest existing bank in France, founded in 1760)
 , Alsace, Lorraine
 , Savoy
 , Massif Central
 , Lyon
 , Limoges
 , Marseille
  itself in the rest of France
 , a stock brokerage firm

 is mainly owned by Société Générale but run separately from Société Générale's own French retail banking network.  specialises on professionals and small business. It serves about 1.5 million customers in more than 700 stores (2006).

History
 started in Lille in 1848. After buying a number of small banks, it was, in turn, acquired by Paribas between 1972 (35% owned) and 1988 (100% owned) but remained run as a separate network. In the following years several regional French banks were brought in the group while retaining their names. 
   
In 1984, it was the fifth-ranking French banking group. It rebranded itself, after working with Creative Business (a public relations company), with a new logo, graphics of its name, the architecture of its branches, and public relations. It changed its logo from an orange cube to a blue star.

Since 2000,  is 80% owned by Société Générale and 20% by Dexia.

Controversy 

In 2010, the French government's  (the department in charge of regulating competition) fined eleven banks, including , the sum of €384,900,000 for colluding to charge unjustified fees on check processing, especially for extra fees charged during the transition from paper check transfer to "Exchanges Check-Image" electronic transfer.

References

External links

 Credit du Nord bank profile

Société Générale